Maria Scheffold (1912 – 1970) was a German chess player who won West Germany Women's Chess Championship (1960).

Chess career 

Maria Scheffold won the Württemberg Women's Chess Championship in 1955 and shared 5th place at the West Germany Women's Chess Championship in 1956 in Wolfratshausen. In November 1960, Maria Scheffold won West Germany Women's Chess Championship in Büdingen.

She took part in other West Germany Women's Chess Championships:
 in 1955 in Krefeld, winner Friedl Rinder;
 in 1957 in Lindau, winner Helga Axt;
 in 1959 in Dahn, winner Friedl Rinder;
 in 1961 in Wennigsen, winner Helga Axt;
 in 1965 in Wangen im Allgäu, winner Ottilie Stibaner.

She was a member of chess club SC Wangen.

References

External links 
Chronicle of SC Wangen Curriculum vitae and picture Wolfgang Unzicker giving a simultaneous exhibition with Maria Scheffold
German women's championship 1960. Schach-Echo 1960, Issue 23, title page 2
German women's chess championships: reports, photos and overview since 1939 from TeleSchach

1912 births
1970 deaths
German female chess players